Leon Krekovic (born 7 May 2000) is a Croatian footballer who plays for HNK Šibenik of the Croatian First Football League.

Club career
Krekovic started his senior career with HNK Hajduk Split in the Croatian First Football League, where he has made eleven league appearances and scored one goal.

In July 2021, he signed a two-year contract with Beerschot in Belgium.

International career
He represented Croatia at the 2017 UEFA European Under-17 Championship where Croatia was eliminated at group stage.

References

External links
Named after the Pope, his role model is Ronaldo, and he scores for Hajduk...

2000 births
Living people
Sportspeople from Knin
Association football forwards
Croatian footballers
Croatia youth international footballers
HNK Hajduk Split II players
HNK Hajduk Split players
NK Dugopolje players
K Beerschot VA players
HNK Šibenik players
Croatian Football League players
First Football League (Croatia) players
Belgian Pro League players
Croatian expatriate footballers
Expatriate footballers in Belgium
Croatian expatriate sportspeople in Belgium